These are the full results of the 2004 European Athletics Indoor Cup which was held on 14 February 2004 at the Arena Leipzig in Leipzig, Germany.

Men's results

60 metres

400 metres

800 metres

1500 metres

3000 metres

60 metres hurdles

Swedish relay (800/600/400/200 metres)

Pole vault

Triple jump

Women's results

60 metres

400 metres

800 metres

1500 metres

3000 metres

60 metres hurdles

Swedish relay (800/600/400/200 metres)

High jump

Long jump

Shot put

References

European Athletics Indoor Cup
European